Mohiuddin Ahmad (popularly known as Mohammad Mohiuddin) is a Bangladeshi film director, writer and producer. In 1982, he won the Bangladesh National Film Award for Best Director for the film Boro Bhalo Lok Chhilo and in 1991 he won Bangladesh National Film Award for Best Story for the film Padma Meghna Jamuna.

Selected films
 Matir Pahar - 1959
 Tomar Amar - 1961
 Raja Elo Shohore - 1964
 Shit Bikle - 1964
 Godhulir Prem - 1965
 Isa Khan - 1974
 Surja Dighal Bari - 1979
 Protiggya - 1980
 Boro Bhalo Lok Chhilo - 1982
 Padma Meghna Jamuna - 1991

Awards and nominations
National Film Awards

References

Footnotes

Bibliography

External links
 

Living people
Bangladeshi film directors
Bangladeshi film producers
Best Director National Film Award (Bangladesh) winners
Year of birth missing (living people)
Best Story National Film Award (Bangladesh) winners